Lomatium caruifolium, known by the common name alkali desertparsley, is a species of flowering plant in the carrot family.

Distribution
The perennial herb is endemic to California, in the Central Valley and the foothills of the Inner California Coast Ranges and Sierra Nevada.

It grows in seasonally wet grassland and riparian areas, such as vernal pools, and other temporary and alkaline puddles.

Description 
It generally lacks a stem, producing erect leaves and inflorescences from ground level. The leaves are up to 30 centimeters long and divided into many highly divided leaflets with narrow, pointed lobes.

The inflorescence is topped with an umbel of yellowish to purplish flowers.

Varieties
Lomatium caruifolium var. caruifolium — primarily San Joaquin Valley, Bay Area, California Coast Ranges, central Sierra Nevada foothills.
Lomatium caruifolium var. denticulatum — primarily in the Sacramento Valley, northern Sierra Nevada foothills.

References

External links
Calflora Database: Lomatium caruifolium (Alkali parsnip, alkali desertparsley, caraway leaved lomatium)
Jepson Manual eFlora (TJM2) treatment of Lomatium caruifolium
USDA Plants Profile for Lomatium caruifolium (alkali desertparsley)
UC Photos gallery — Lomatium caruifolium

caruifolium
Endemic flora of California
Flora of the Sierra Nevada (United States)
Natural history of the California chaparral and woodlands
Natural history of the California Coast Ranges
Natural history of the Central Valley (California)
Taxa named by John Merle Coulter
Flora without expected TNC conservation status